Tibor Nagy is a Hungarian sprint canoer who competed in the early to mid-1970s. He won a gold medal in the K-4 10000 m at the 1973 ICF Canoe Sprint World Championships in Tampere.

References

Hungarian male canoeists
Living people
Year of birth missing (living people)
ICF Canoe Sprint World Championships medalists in kayak